Ojos de Agua is a municipality in Comayagua Department in Honduras.

Municipalities of the Comayagua Department